Neill Ford Armstrong (March 9, 1926 – August 10, 2016) was an American football player and coach whose career spanned more than four decades at both the college and professional levels.  Notably, Armstrong served as the head coach of the Edmonton Eskimos of the Canadian Football League (CFL) and the Chicago Bears of the National Football League (NFL). Member of the 1945 National Championship Oklahoma A&M Team.

Playing career
Armstrong played college football at Oklahoma A & M from 1943 to 1946, and was chosen in the first round (eighth overall) of the 1947 NFL Draft by the Philadelphia Eagles.  Playing both at end and defensive back, he helped the team capture the NFL championship in both 1948 and 1949.  Armstrong concluded his playing career in the early 1950s playing for the CFL's Winnipeg Blue Bombers.

Coaching career
In 1962, Armstrong's professional coaching career began when he was hired as an assistant coach with the Houston Oilers of the start-up American Football League (AFL).  After serving two years in that capacity, he shifted back to Canada as head coach of the Edmonton Eskimos.  In his six years, the team reached the postseason three times.

Armstrong was hired as an assistant with the Minnesota Vikings in 1970, and became an integral part of developing the team's dominating defense.  After helping the team reach the postseason in all but one of the next eight years, he was hired as head coach of the Chicago Bears on February 16, 1978. In four years at the helm of the Bears, he was only able to compile a record of 30–35, with one playoff appearance in 1979.  He was fired on January 3, 1982, but hired less than two months later as an assistant with the Dallas Cowboys.  He spent the next eight seasons with the team before announcing his retirement on February 22, 1990. He and Bud Grant hold the distinction of being the only two people to have both played and been a head coach in both the NFL and CFL. He died in Trophy Club, Texas in 2016.

Head coaching record

NFL

See also
 List of NCAA major college football yearly receiving leaders

References

External links
 

1926 births
2016 deaths
American football defensive backs
American football ends
American men's basketball players
American players of Canadian football
Canadian football wide receivers
Chicago Bears head coaches
Dallas Cowboys coaches
Edmonton Elks coaches
Houston Oilers coaches
Minnesota Vikings coaches
Oklahoma State Cowboys basketball players
Oklahoma State Cowboys football coaches
Oklahoma State Cowboys football players
Philadelphia Eagles players
Winnipeg Blue Bombers players
People from Tishomingo, Oklahoma
Coaches of American football from Oklahoma
Players of American football from Oklahoma
Basketball players from Oklahoma